Henry Ate was a South African band that came to fame in the mid-1990s. Headed up at the time by lead singer Karma-Ann Swanepoel, who relocated to South Florida in 2003.

Julian Sun was also responsible for song writing for the band, as well as backing vocals and acoustics. Together he and Karma were responsible for some of Henry Ate's albums.

Discography
Slap in the Face (Tic Tic Bang, 1996)
"Jesus made me" 
"Hey Mister" 
"Mother Superior" 
"Pandora's Child" 
"Fashionably Large" 
"Waves of Salt" 
"Eudaimonia" 
"Henry" 
"Mr Blue" 
"No Intrusion" 
"So He Says" 
"Station Bench" 
"Just"
One Day Soon (as Karma) [1998]
Torn and Tattered [2000] 
96 - 02 - The Singles [2002]

References
https://web.archive.org/web/20041029183159/http://www.miaminewtimes.com/issues/2004-10-07/music3.html

External links 
 http://www.henryate.com/biographygreatest.htm

South African rock music groups